Stellan Rye (4 July 1880 – 14 November 1914) was a Danish-born film director, active in the early 20th century.  Rye was born in Randers. 

In 1913 he created (together with Hanns Heinz Ewers and Paul Wegener) the silent film Der Student von Prag (The Student of Prague).
At the outbreak of World War I he joined the Reichsheer (German Army). He died in France, a prisoner of war.

External links
Biography  from the German Film association

1880 births
1914 deaths
Danish film directors
German military personnel killed in World War I
German prisoners of war in World War I
World War I prisoners of war held by France
Prisoners who died in French detention
People from Randers
German Army personnel of World War I
Danish emigrants to Germany